The men's parallel bars event was part of the gymnastics programme at the 1924 Summer Olympics. It was one of nine gymnastics events and it was contested for the third time after 1896 and 1904. The competition was held on Sunday, July 20, 1924. Seventy-two gymnasts from nine nations competed. The event was won by August Güttinger of Switzerland, the nation's first victory in the event. Robert Pražák of Czechoslovakia and Giorgio Zampori of Italy earned silver and bronze, respectively.

Background

This was the third appearance of the event, which is one of the five apparatus events held every time there were apparatus events at the Summer Olympics (no apparatus events were held in 1900, 1908, 1912, or 1920). The 1922 world championship was won by Leon Štukelj of Yugoslavia, with a five-way tie for second between multiple gymnasts from each of Yugoslavia and Czechoslavkia (three of whom—Stane Derganc, Miroslav Klinger, and Stanislav Indruch—competed at the 1924 Games along with Štukelj.

Three nations had previously competed, France and Switzerland in 1896 and the United States in 1904. The other six nations (Czechoslovakia, Finland, Great Britain, Italy, Luxembourg, and Yugoslavia) were competing for the first time.

Competition format

Each gymnast performed a compulsory exercise and a voluntary exercise. These two exercises were 2 of the 11 components of the individual all-around score, and thus were also included in the team all-around score. Each exercise had a maximum possible score of 11, with half a point each for the approach and dismount and up to 10 points for the routine.

Schedule

The competition was held in a single day.

Results

References

Official Olympic Report
 

Parallel bars
Men's 1924